(1945–) is a Japanese musician active in the Okinawan music and shima-uta scene, as a performer on the sanshin, min'yō folk singer, song-writer, and producer, having been responsible in 1990 for the formation of the Nēnēs.

Biography
China Sadao was born in Fukuoka Prefecture in 1945, the family moving to Amagasaki in Hyōgo Prefecture in 1951. His father, a musician from Okinawa Prefecture, had moved from Okinawa in search of work, making a living in a spinning mill and by gathering scrap metal from drainage ditches. As a young child, Sadao disliked the nostalgic shima-uta performed by his father and tried to suppress his uchināguchi dialect; he would later recall his embarrassment when his father appeared at an athletics meet with a sanshin and taiko. In 1957, father and son returned to Okinawa, where Sadao began his studies, at his father's recommendation, as an uchi-deshi with Okinawan musician Noborikawa Seijin. That same year he made his official debut recording, at the age of twelve, with a performance of the min'yō . In 1963, after meeting composer Tsuneo Fukuhara, he began to study Western classical music and the classical guitar. His career lasting over sixty years, in December 2020 he performed at a fund-raising concert for the rebuilding of Shuri Castle.

Select discography
 Akabana「赤花」(1978)
 Shima-uta Hyakkei「島唄百景」(2009)

See also
 Ryūkyūan music
 Kina Shōkichi

References

Okinawan folk musicians
1945 births
Living people